Maritime archaeology (also known as marine archaeology) is a discipline within archaeology as a whole that specifically studies human interaction with the sea, lakes and rivers through the study of associated physical remains, be they vessels, shore-side facilities, port-related structures, cargoes, human remains and submerged landscapes.  A specialty within maritime archaeology is nautical archaeology, which studies ship construction and use.

As with archaeology as a whole, maritime archaeology can be practised within the historical, industrial, or prehistoric periods. An associated discipline, and again one that lies within archaeology itself, is underwater archaeology, which studies the past through any submerged remains be they of maritime interest or not. An example from the prehistoric era would be  the remains of submerged settlements or deposits now lying under water despite having been dry land when sea levels were lower. The study of submerged aircraft lost in lakes, rivers or in the sea is an example from the historical, industrial or modern era. Another example are the remains of discovered and potential medieval bridges connecting the islands on the lake with the mainland. Many specialist sub-disciplines within the broader maritime and  underwater archaeological categories have emerged in recent years.

Maritime archaeological sites often result from shipwrecks or sometimes seismic activity, and thus represent a moment in time rather than a slow deposition of material accumulated over a period of years, as is the case with port-related structures (such as piers, wharves, docks and jetties) where objects  are lost or thrown off structures over extended periods of time. This fact has led to shipwrecks often being described  in the media and in popular accounts as 'time capsules'.

Archaeological material in the sea or in other underwater environments is typically subject to different factors than artifacts on land. However, as with terrestrial archaeology, what survives to be investigated by modern archaeologists can often be a tiny fraction of the material originally deposited. A feature of maritime archaeology is that despite all the material that is lost, there are occasional rare examples of substantial survival, from which a great deal can be learned, due to the difficulties often experienced in accessing the sites.

There are those in the archaeology community who see maritime archaeology as a separate discipline with its own concerns (such as shipwrecks) and requiring the specialized skills of the underwater archaeologist.  Others value an integrated approach, stressing that nautical activity has economic and social links to communities on land and that archaeology is archaeology no matter  where the study is conducted. All that is required is the mastering of skills specific to the environment in which the work occurs.

Integrating land and sea
Before the industrial era, travel by water was often easier than over land. As a result, marine channels, navigable rivers and sea crossings formed the trade routes of historic and ancient civilisations. For example, the Mediterranean Sea was known to the Romans as the inner sea because the Roman empire spread around its coasts. The historic record as well as the remains of harbours, ships and cargoes, testify to the volume of trade that crossed it.  Later, nations with a strong maritime culture such as the United Kingdom, the Netherlands, Denmark,  Portugal and Spain were able to establish colonies on other continents. Wars were fought at sea over the control of important resources. The material cultural remains that are discovered by maritime archaeologists along former trade routes can be combined with historical documents and material cultural remains found on land to understand the economic, social and political environment of the past. Of late maritime archaeologists have been examining the submerged  cultural remains  of   China,  India,  Korea and other Asian nations.

Preservation of material underwater

There are significant differences in the survival of archaeological material depending on whether a site is wet or dry, on the nature of the chemical environment, on the presence of biological organisms and on the dynamic forces present.  Thus rocky coastlines, especially in shallow water, are typically inimical to the survival of artifacts, which can be dispersed, smashed or ground by the effect of currents and surf, possibly (but not always) leaving an artifact pattern but little if any wreck structure.

Saltwater is particularly inimical to iron artefacts including metal shipwrecks, and sea organisms will readily consume organic material such as wooden shipwrecks. On the other hand, out of all the thousands of potential archaeological sites destroyed or grossly eroded by such natural processes, occasionally sites survive with exceptional preservation of a related collection of artifacts. Survival in this instance is largely due to the remains being buried in sediment

Of the many examples where the sea bed provides an extremely hostile environment for submerged evidence of history, one of the most notable, though a relatively young wreck and in deep water so calcium-starved that concretion  does not occur, appears strong and relatively intact, though indications are that it has already incurred irreversible degradation of her steel and iron hull. As such degradation inevitably continues, data will be forever lost, objects' context will be destroyed and the bulk of the wreck will over centuries  completely deteriorate on the floor of the Atlantic Ocean. Where it remains even after the passage of time,  the iron or steel hull is often fragile with no remaining metal within the layer of concretion and corrosion products. , having been found in the 1970s, was subjected to a program of attempted in situ preservation, for example, but deterioration of the vessel progressed at such a rate that the rescue of her turret was undertaken lest nothing be saved from the wreck.

Some wrecks, lost to natural obstacles to navigation, are at risk of being smashed by subsequent wrecks sunk by the same hazard, or are deliberately destroyed because they present a hazard to navigation. Even in deep water, commercial activities such as pipe-laying operations and deep sea trawling can place a wreck at risk. The shipwreck lay forgotten at the bottom of the sea until it was discovered in 2002 by an oilfield inspection crew working for the Okeanos Gas Gathering Company (OGGC). Large pipelines can crush sites and render some of their remnants inaccessible as pipe is dropped from the ocean surface to the substrate thousands of feet below. Trawl nets snag and tear superstructures and separate artifacts from their context.

The wrecks, and other archaeological sites that have been preserved have generally survived because the dynamic nature of the sea bed can result in artifacts becoming rapidly buried in sediments. These sediments then provide an anaerobic environment which protects from further degradation. Wet environments, whether on land in the form of peat bogs and wells, or underwater are particularly important for the survival of organic material, such as wood, leather, fabric and horn. Cold and absence of light also aid survival of artifacts, because there is little energy available for either organic activity or chemical reactions. Salt water provides for greater organic activity than freshwater, and in particular, the shipworm, Teredo navalis, lives only in salt water, so some of the best preservation in the absence of sediments has been found in the cold, dark waters of the Great Lakes in North America and in the (low salinity) Baltic Sea (where Vasa was preserved).

While the land surface is continuously reused by societies, the sea bed was largely inaccessible until the advent of submarines, scuba equipment and remotely operated underwater vehicles (ROVs) in the twentieth century. Salvagers have operated in much earlier times, but much of the material was beyond the reach of anyone. Thus Mary Rose was subject to salvage from the sixteenth century and later, but a very large amount of material, buried in the sediments, remained to be found by maritime archaeologists of the twentieth century.

While preservation in situ is not assured, material that has survived underwater and is then recovered to land is typically in an unstable state and can only be preserved using highly specialised conservation processes.  While the wooden structure of Mary Rose and the individual artifacts have been undergoing conservation since their recovery,  provides an example of a relatively recent (metal) wreck for which extensive conservation has been necessary to preserve the hull. While the hull remains intact, its  machinery remains inoperable. The engine of  that was recovered in 1985 from a saline environment after over a century underwater is presently considered somewhat anomalous, in that after two decades of treatment it can now be turned over by hand.

A challenge for the modern archaeologist is to consider whether  in-situ preservation, or recovery and conservation on land is the preferable option; or to face the fact that preservation in any form, other than as an archaeological record is not feasible. A site that has been discovered has typically been subjected to disturbance of the very factors that caused its survival in the first place, for example, when a covering of sediment has been removed by storms or the action of man. Active monitoring and deliberate protection may mitigate  further rapid destruction making in situ preservation an option, but long-term survival can never be guaranteed. For very many sites, the costs are too great for either active measures to ensure in situ preservation or to provide for satisfactory conservation on recovery. Even the cost of proper and complete archaeological investigation may be too great to enable this to occur within a timescale that ensures that an archaeological record is made before data is inevitably lost.

Submerged sites

Pre-historic landscapes
Maritime archaeology studies prehistorical objects and sites that are, because of changes in climate and geology, now underwater.

Bodies of water, fresh and saline, have been important sources of food for people for as long as we have existed. It should be no surprise that ancient villages were located at the water's edge.

Therefore, a great deal of the record of human activity throughout the Ice Age is now to be found under water.

The flooding of the area now known as the Black Sea (when a land bridge, where  the Bosporus is now, collapsed under the pressure of rising water in the Mediterranean Sea) submerged a great deal of human activity that had been gathered round what had been an enormous, fresh-water lake.

Significant cave art sites off the coast of western Europe such as the  Grotto Cosquer can be reached only by diving, because the cave entrances are underwater, though the upper portions of  the caves themselves are not flooded.

Historic sites
Throughout history, seismic events have at times caused submergence of human settlements.  The remains of such catastrophes exist all over the world, and sites such as Alexandria, Port Royal and Mary Rose now form important archaeological sites that are being protected, managed and conserved. As with shipwrecks, archaeological research can follow multiple themes, including evidence of the final catastrophe, the structures and landscape before the catastrophe and the culture and economy of which it formed a part. Unlike the wrecking of a ship, the destruction of a town by a seismic event can take place over many years and there may be evidence for several phases of damage, sometimes with rebuilding in between.

Coastal and foreshore

Not all maritime sites are underwater.  There are many structures at the margin of land and water that provide evidence of the human societies of the past. Some are deliberately created for access - such as bridges and walkways. Other structures remain from exploitation of resources, such as dams and fish traps. Nautical remains include early harbours and places where ships were built or repaired. At the end of their life, ships were often beached.  Valuable or easily accessed timber has often been salvaged  leaving just a few frames and bottom planking.

Archaeological sites can also be found on the foreshore today that would have been on dry land when they were constructed. An example of such a site is Seahenge, a Bronze Age timber circle.

Ships and shipwrecks

The archaeology of shipwrecks  can be divided into a three-tier hierarchy, of which the first tier considers the wrecking process itself: how does a ship break up, how does a ship sink to the bottom, and how do the remains of the ship, cargo and the surrounding environment evolve over time? The second tier studies the ship as a machine, both in itself and in a military or economic system. The third tier consists of the archaeology of maritime cultures, in which nautical technology, naval warfare, trade and shipboard societies are studied. Some consider this to be the most important  tier.  Ships and boats are not necessarily wrecked: some are deliberately abandoned, scuttled or beached.  Many such abandoned vessels have been extensively salvaged.

Bronze Age
The earliest boats discovered date from the Bronze Age and are constructed of hollowed out logs or sewn planks. Vessels have been discovered where they have been preserved in sediments underwater or in waterlogged land sites, such as the discovery of a canoe near St Botolphs. Examples of sewn-plank boats include those found at North Ferriby and the Dover Bronze Age Boat which is now displayed at Dover MuseumThe Dover Bronze Age Boat. These may be an evolution from boats made of sewn hides, but it is highly unlikely that hide boats could have survived.

Ships wrecked in the sea have probably not survived, although remains of cargo (particularly bronze material) have been discovered, such as those at the Salcombe B site. A close collection of artefacts on the sea bed may imply that artefacts were from a ship, even if there are no remains of the actual vessel.

Late Bronze Age ships, such as the Uluburun Shipwreck have been discovered in the Mediterranean, constructed of edge joined planks. This shipbuilding technology continued through the classical period.

Maritime archaeology by region

Pacific

An example of maritime archaeology in the Pacific ocean, is the discovery of the wreck of Two Brothers, discovered in 2008 by a team of marine archaeologists working on an expedition for the National Oceanic and Atmospheric Administration (NOAA). The identity of the ship was not immediately known so it was called the "Shark Island Whaler"; the ship's identification as Two Brothers was announced by NOAA on February 11, 2011, the 188th anniversary of her sinking. The wreck is the first discovery of a wrecked Nantucket whaling ship.

Nine historic trade ships carrying ceramics dating back to the 10th century until the 19th century were excavated under Swedish engineer Sten Sjöstrand in the South China Sea.

 Royal Nanhai (circa 1460), found in 1995
 Nanyang (circa 1380), found in 1995
 Xuande (circa 1540), found in 1995
 Longquan (circa 1400), found in 1996
 Turiang (circa 1370), found in 1996
 Singtai (circa 1550), found in 1998
 Desaru (circa 1830), found in 2001
 Tanjong Simpang (AD 960- 1127), found in 2001
 Wanli (early 17th century), found in 2003

Mediterranean area

In the Mediterranean area, maritime archaeologists have investigated several ancient cultures. Notable early Iron Age shipwrecks include two Phoenician ships of c. 750 BC that foundered off Gaza with cargoes of wine in amphoras.  The crew of the U.S. Navy deep submergence research submarine NR-1 discovered the sites in 1997. In 1999 a team led by Robert Ballard and Harvard University archaeology Professor Lawrence Stager investigated the wrecks.

Extensive research has been carried out on the Mediterranean and Aegean coastlines of Turkey. Complete excavations have been performed on several wrecks from the Classical, Hellenistic, Byzantine, and Ottoman periods.

Maritime archaeological studies in Italy illuminate the naval and maritime activities of the Etruscans, Greek colonists, and Romans. After the 2nd century BC, the Roman fleet ruled the Mediterranean and actively suppressed piracy. During this Pax Romana, seaborne trade increased significantly throughout the region. Though sailing was the safest, fastest, and most efficient method of transportation in the ancient world, some fractional percentage of voyages ended in shipwreck. With the significantly increased sea traffic during the Roman era came a corresponding increase in shipwrecks. These wrecks and their cargo remains offer glimpses through time of the economy, culture, and politics of the ancient world. Particularly useful to archaeologists are studies of amphoras, the ceramic shipping containers used in the Mediterranean region from the 15th century BC through the Medieval period.

In addition to many discoveries in the sea, some wrecks have been examined in lakes. Most notable are Caligula's pleasure barges in Lake Nemi, Italy. The Nemi ships and other shipwreck sites occasionally yield objects of unique artistic value. For instance, the Antikythera wreck contained a staggering collection of marble and bronze statues including the Antikythera Youth. Discovered in 1900 by Greek sponge divers, the ship probably sank in the 1st century BC and may have been dispatched by the Roman general, Sulla, to carry booty back to Rome. The sponge divers also recovered from the wreck the famous Antikythera mechanism, believed to be an astronomical calculator. Further examples of fabulous works of art recovered from the sea floor are the two "bronzi" found in Riace (Calabria), Italy. In the cases of Antikythera and Riace, however, the artifacts were recovered without the direct participation of maritime archaeologists.

Recent studies in the Sarno river (near Pompeii) show other interesting elements of ancient life. The Sarno projects suggests that on the Tyrrhenian shore there were little towns with palafittes, similar to ancient Venice. In the same area, the submerged town of Puteoli (Pozzuoli, close to Naples) contains the "portus Julius" created by Marcus Vipsanius Agrippa in 37 BC, later sunk due to bradyseism.

The sea floor elsewhere in the Mediterranean holds countless archaeological sites. In Israel, Herod the Great's port at Caesarea Maritima has been extensively studied. Other finds are consistent with some passages of the Bible (like the so-called Jesus boat, which appears to have been in use during the first century AD).

Australia
Maritime archaeology in Australia commenced in the 1970s with the advent of Jeremy Green due to concerns expressed by academics and politicians with the rampant destruction of the Dutch and British East India ships lost on the west coast. As Commonwealth legislation was enacted  and enforced after 1976 and as States enacted their own legislation the sub-discipline spread throughout Australia concentrating initially  on shipwrecks due to on-going funding by both the States and the Commonwealth under their shipwreck legislation. Studies now include as an element of underwater archaeology, as a whole, the study of submerged indigenous sites. Nautical Archaeology, (the specialised study of boat and ship construction)  is also practised in the region. Often the sites or relics  studied in Australia as in the rest of the world  are not inundated.  The study of  historic  submerged aircraft, better known as a sub-discipline of aviation archaeology, underwater aviation archaeology is  also practised in the region. In some  states  maritime  and underwater archaeology is practised  out of Museums and in others out of cultural heritage management units, and all practitioners operate under  the aegis of the Australasian Institute for Maritime Archaeology (AIMA).

See also
Australasian Underwater Cultural Heritage Database
Maritime archaeology of East Africa
Nautical Archaeology Society
 Maritime Archaeology Trust
Lighthouse Archaeological Maritime Program (LAMP)
RPM Nautical Foundation
Sea Research Society
Institute of Nautical Archaeology
UNESCO Convention on the Protection of the Underwater Cultural Heritage is an international treaty, fighting the increasing looting and destruction of underwater cultural heritage. It regulates heritage protection and facilitates State cooperation; it does, however, not regulate ownership of cultural property.

Submerged historic and pre-historic sites
 Bouldnor Cliff
 Alexandria
 Port Royal
Maritime Heritage Trail - Battle of Saipan
 Port Julius ULIXES la guida dei Campi Flegrei at Puteoli

Coastal and foreshore archaeology
  Seahenge

Ships and boats
 Antikythera c 80-50 BC, includes the astronomical computer, the Antikythera mechanism
 Cape Gelidonya – Late Bronze Age shipwreck, c. 1200 BC
 City of Adelaide (1864) – 19th century clipper, Scotland
 North Ferriby – site of discovery of Bronze Age sewn plank boats dated by radiocarbon to between 1890 BC to 1700 BC
Belle shipwreck – French explorer La Salle's ship, lost in 1686 off Texas
Batavia shipwreck – Dutch East Indies ship, lost in 1629 off Western Australia
Hunley – the first submarine to sink an enemy ship, lost off Charleston, South Carolina, in 1864
Half Moon (shipwreck) – A racing sailboat which sank in 1930 near Miami, Florida, United States - and one of the sites in the Florida Maritime Heritage Trail
 Ma'agan Michael Ship – A 5th century BC boat discovered off the coast of Israel
 Madrague de Giens c 75-60 BC, Roman merchantman sunk of the coast of La Madrague de Giens, east of Toulon
 Nineteenth century boat discovered at Leamington Wharf, Union Canal
SS Xantho – Iron-hulled steamship, lost in 1872 off Western Australia. Its historic engine was raised in 1985 and can now be turned over by hand
 Uluburun – Late Bronze Age shipwreck, 14th century BC
 Condura Croatica – 11th century, port of Nin, Croatia
 Queen Anne's Revenge – Blackbeard's flagship, 18th century frigate, Beaufort, NC.

References

External links
  UK resource, with access to information on more than 45,000 wrecks, mapped thematically for a wide variety of search criteria
 (US) 
  (US)

 Affiliated with Texas University

 
Underwater archaeology
Maritime history